People-Animals-Nature (PAN) is an environmentalist, animal rights and animal welfare focused political party in Portugal, founded in 2009. In 2015, they won one seat in the Assembly of the Republic. In 2019, they also won one seat in the European Parliament, and increased their seat share to 4 in the Assembly (with 2 seats won in Lisbon, 1 in Porto, and 1 in Setúbal).

In the 2011 Madeiran regional election, it had 2.13% of the votes, with a total of 3,135 votes, thus having elected one MP also in this regional parliament, Rui Manuel dos Santos Almeida.

In November 2021, on the brink of a political crisis, the then called geringonça (an informal left-wing alliance) imploded due to divergences regarding laboral legislations and the following year's state budget. PAN remained the only party in the parliament to abstain voting arguing that the country wasn't ready for another political and probably financial crisis in times of COVID-19 pandemics. However, this political move had no effect in the end voting results and the government was dissolved by then President, Marcelo Rebelo de Sousa.

Ideology, political position and policies 
People-Animals-Nature is commonly described as an environmentalist party. It has been described as becoming "known for fighting for animal rights", "fights against cruelty to animals" and as having an "animalist" ideology.

The party has also been described as holding ecofeminist and progressive ideologies. However, it has also been described as being "identified neither from the right nor from the left." Although other sources have identified the party as being on the centre-left of the political spectrum.

In terms of policy the party has "campaigned to invest in the national health service but does believe that the private and public sectors can work together", supports free transportation to combat climate change and cutting Portugal's corporate income tax rate to 17 percent by 2026. Party MP and then spokesperson for the party, André Silva, on the party's fifth anniversary in January 2016 said the party's visibility had highlighted, "causes, values, messages, ideas and measures that nobody else talks about", such as "bull fighting, climate change and oil drilling", which he dubbed "forgotten subjects". Along with the political party LIVRE, PAN has "sparked conversations with proposals for unconditional basic income".

Electoral results

Assembly of the Republic 
Vote share in the Portuguese legislative elections

European Parliament

Regional Assemblies

Municipalities

Parishes

Local results

List of leaders

Notes

References

External links 

Animal Politics EU

2009 establishments in Portugal
Animal advocacy parties
Animal welfare and rights in Portugal
Ecofeminism
Environmentalism in Portugal
Organisations based in Lisbon
Political parties established in 2009
Political parties in Portugal
Political parties supporting universal basic income